Jack Ireland (born 26 August 1999)  is an Australian Paralympic swimmer with an intellectual disability. He won a silver medal at the 2022 World Para Swimming Championships.

Personal
He was born 26 August 1999. He grew up in Newcastle, New South Wales. He moved to Gladstone, QLD in 2013 and attended Gladstone State High School. Jack moved to Brisbane in 2016 and attended his final school year via Brisbane Distance Education.

Swimming career
Ireland started swimming at Floraville Public School in Newcastle, New South Wales. He is classified as a S14 swimmer. At the age of thirteen, he moved to Gladstone QLD with his family and joined Gladstone Gladiators Swim Club. In 2016, he relocated to the Brisbane suburb of St Lucia, to be coached by David Heyden at the University of Queensland Swim Club. Jack made his international debut in 2017 at the Para World Series In Indianapolis. In 2018, he competed at the Para Pan Pac Championships in Cairns as part of the Australia A Team. 2019 saw him selected as an Australian Dolphin #P304. At his first major international competition - 2019 World Para Swimming Championships, London, he finished 8th in the Men's 200m freestyle S14 final.

At the 2022 World Para Swimming Championships in Madeira, he won a silver medal in the Mixed  freestyle relay S14 and finished fourth Men's 200 m Freestyle S14 .

At the 2022 Commonwealth Games, he won the bronze medal in the 200 m  freestyle S14.

He is coached by David Heyden at the University of Queensland Swim Club.

Recognition-
 2016/17 - Swimmer with Disability of the Year by Brisbane Swimming in Queensland, Australia.
 2016 - Gladstone Regional Council Australia Day Junior Athlete of the Year.

References

External links
 
 
 

1999 births
Living people
Male Paralympic swimmers of Australia
S14-classified Paralympic swimmers
Australian male freestyle swimmers
Swimmers at the 2022 Commonwealth Games
Commonwealth Games medallists in swimming
Commonwealth Games bronze medallists for Australia
20th-century Australian people
21st-century Australian people
Medallists at the 2022 Commonwealth Games